Energy poverty is defined as lacking access to the affordable sustainable energy service. Geographically, it is unevenly distributed in developing and developed countries. In 2019, there were an estimated 770 million people who have no access to electricity, with approximately 95% distributed in Asia and sub-Saharan Africa.

In developing countries, poor women and girls living in the rural areas are significantly affected by energy poverty, because they are usually responsible for providing the primary energy for households. In developed countries, old women living alone are mostly affected by energy poverty due to the low income and high cost of energy service.

Even though energy access is an important climate change adaptation tool especially for maintaining health (i.e. access to air conditioning, information etc.), a systematic review published in 2019 found that research does not account for these effects onto vulnerable populations like women.

In developing countries

Domestic responsibilities 
In developing countries, energy poverty has significant gender characteristics. Approximately 70% of the 1.3 billion population in the developing countries living in poverty are women. Women living in rural areas are usually responsible for housework, including gathering fuels and water, cooking, farming etc. Studies in India indicates that rural women provide approximately 92% of total household energy supply, and 85% of their energy for cooking is provided by the biomass from forests or fields.

Health impacts from energy consumption 
Energy poverty in rural households causes the health problems of women and children. One health problem is caused by indoor air pollution from traditional stoves. Study indicated that cooking with biomass is predicted to lead to 1.5 million deaths per year by 2030. The other health risks are caused by the heavy workload of collecting fuels and exposed to malnutrition. Meanwhile, the scarcity of fuel makes them less likely to use the fuels for cooking waters, which might increase risk of water-borne diseases.

Also powering of medical equipment and stools, storage of blood and vaccines, performing of basic health procedures after dark are all possible on reliable energy supply. Unreliable energy supply prevent patient care at night especially pregnant women during delivery and those undergoing emergency caesarean section at night. All these result to 95% of maternal mortality in sub-Saharan Africa.

Time poverty 
Energy poverty further affects women by putting them into the situation of "time poverty", which refers to the lack of time for resting, leisure, working outsides, getting education etc. It is the consequence of spending a long time gathering the fuels to supply the domestic energy use. The forest degradation caused by climate change might exaggerate the current problem.

Participation in decision-making 
Studies also show that in the rural areas in developing countries, men usually have more power in making decision in purchasing energy devices or new technologies. Excluding women from participating public discussion and decision-making process is likely to lead to the failure in addressing the effects of energy poverty on women.

Energy Poverty and Education[edit]

Energy poverty affect teaching and learning.Lack of access to energy reduces children performance and attendence especially the girl child at school. Childern are force to spent an inordinated amount of time gathering biomass energy. Energy povery increases gender inequality in the ratio of boy to girl at school and also increases the illiteracy rate amongst women[edit] 

Example

In sub-Saharan African countries, energy poverty is especially challenging, due to the high cost of extending grid electricity in existing scattered rural settlement. For example, in Tanzania, energy poverty is affecting the livelihood of the majority, with only 15.5% of the population has access to electricity. The lack of electricity leads to the missing of efficient energy services like cooking, lighting etc. Hence the basic capabilities for development, like education, health, transportation are restricted. In face of energy poverty, the burden of supplying household energy use disproportionately lies on women than men. A case study in Tanzania examines impact of a women-oriented solar lighting social enterprise project on health, education, livelihood and gender equality. The results indicate that increasing the accessibility to energy service for women, could contribute to empowering women, children and local families’ development.

In developed countries 
In developed countries, lone and old women are affected disproportionately by energy poverty. There are more women living alone than men because of their relatively longer life expectancy. Those older women usually have less pensions to support themselves, because they worked mostly inside the house. The rise in energy cost affects the affordability of heating and cooling service at home. Data from the UK Office for National Statistics  indicates that, women have higher Excess Winter Mortality (EWM) more than men, and there is an increase of EWM from 8.2% to 12.4% between 2013 and 2012, among women under 65. Furthermore, the increasing energy price, relative low income, and together energy-inefficient houses contribute to energy poverty in developed countries.

Components

There are gender gaps in the energy labor market, energy-related education and decision-making process in developed countries. In the European Union, men dominant the energy sector with 77.9% in the workforce. Studies show that the under-representation is attributed to the following reasons: lack of necessary skills caused by the energy education gap, the perception of stereotypical men-domain energy sectors, and lack of opportunities for women working in energy sectors. The gendered energy education is related to the traditional images of ‘feminine’ or ‘masculine’ subjects as well as the lack of mentoring programs engaging female students to study in science subjects, like energy. Women are also under-represented in the decision-making process in energy sections in developed countries. A study conducted in Germany, Sweden and Spain shows that there is no female staff work in management group or as board member in the 295 energy companies they investigated in 2010. Similar situation is observed in the public energy sector, with 82.7% of high-level position occupied by men, though it is better in Nordic countries than in Mediterranean countries. Those gender gaps contribute to the "gender blindness" in the energy policies in developed countries.

Example 
Caitlin Robinson (2019) conducted a study on gender and poverty in England. With the socio-spatial analysis, he argued that energy poverty could increase the gendered vulnerabilities. Five dimensions of gendered socio-spatial energy vulnerability are examined, including

 Exclusion from a productive economy
 Unpaid reproductive, caring or domestic roles
 Coping and helping others to cope
 Susceptibility to physiological and mental health impacts
 Lack of social protection during a life course "

The result indicated that energy poverty is connected with economic and social activities and health, but more complex effects of energy vulnerability and gender should be analyzed at the household level, since it is relatively individual.

Responses 
Some research indicates that investing in low-emission energy technologies can increase the accessibility to modern energy services, which will benefit the women living in energy poverty. The low-emission technologies are believed to be able to free poor women from fuel collection and drudgery, protect them from the air pollution caused by burning biomass, and enable them to have time for education and participating in public discussion etc.

Other research argues that merely technologies approach is not enough, and suggests engaging local women in the decision-making process for locally appropriate energy programs.

Pueyo & Maestre (2019) further studied whether men and women benefit differently in electrification. The results indicate that electrification benefits women in accessing paid works, but not as much as men. Women still have relatively lower quality works after electrification. Policies that address gender mainstreaming are suggested to consider both women's existing domestic work, and their accessibility to profitable activities, hence empowering them for long-term development.

References 

Energy
Gender
Gender equality